Tizi Ouzou or Thizi Wezzu (Kabyle: Tizi Wezzu) is a city in north central Algeria. It is among the largest cities in Algeria. It is the second most populous city in the Kabylie region after Bejaia.

History

Etymology
The name Tizi Ouzou is made up of two Kabyle words: Tizi meaning col, and Ouzou (from Azzu) meaning Genisteae. The full name of the locality therefore means "the col of the Genisteae".

Friction
Islamists looted, and burned to the ground, a Pentecostal church on 9 January 2010. The pastor was quoted as saying that worshipers fled when local police left a gang of local rioters unchecked.

Geography
This city is located in the heart of Kabylie. Tizi Ouzou is located in the valley of Assif N Sébaou. It is surrounded by mountains. A portion of the old city of Tizi Ouzou (known as the High City) backed the east slopes of the mountain. At the top of the mountain Belloua lies the village of Redjaouna. The latter is attached to the town of Tizi Ouzou.

Climate
Tizi Ouzou experiences a hot Mediterranean climate (Köppen climate classification Csa).

Demographics
There were 118,542 people in 1998.

Sport
The local professional football team is JS Kabylie.

Education
Mouloud Mammeri University of Tizi-Ouzou is the local university. There are three campuses: Campus Hasnaoua I, Campus Hasnaoua II, and Campus Tamda.

Economy 
Agriculture (dairy industry) and some factories brick factories, pharmaceutical factories (Novo Nordisk).

Notable people
 Mohamed Belhocine, Algerian medical scientist, professor of internal medicine and epidemiology.
 Faiza Lalam, Africa's first woman neurosurgeon
 Issad Rebrab, Algerian billionaire businessman.

References

External sources
Jonathan Oaks: Algeria. Bradt Travel Guides 2008, p. 110 (restricted online version (Google Books))
 

Communes of Tizi Ouzou Province
Kabylie
Province seats of Algeria
Berber populated places